Miguel Sandoval (born November 16, 1951) is an American actor of film and television.

Biography 
Sandoval was born in Washington, D.C. He began working as a professional actor in 1975 when he joined a mime school in Albuquerque, New Mexico. He later joined the troupe full-time and continued his study of mime. He began his film career in the early 1980s. He had small roles in such acclaimed films Do the Right Thing, Jungle Fever, and Jurassic Park. After appearing in Clear and Present Danger in 1994, he began to take on larger roles, and appeared in Get Shorty, Up Close & Personal, and Blow.

Having appeared briefly in Repo Man and Sid and Nancy, Sandoval has also played the major roles of Treviranus (in Death and the Compass), Bennie Reyes (in Three Businessmen) and Arizona Gray (in the microfeature Repo Chick) for director Alex Cox. In addition to film, Sandoval has acted in numerous television shows, often in recurring roles. Though shows such as The Court and Kingpin failed, he found success with Medium in 2005, where he played D.A. Manuel Devalos until the series ended in 2011. Sandoval's other guest starring roles include appearances in popular series such as Frasier, ER, The X-Files, Seinfeld, Law & Order and Lois & Clark: The New Adventures of Superman.  He was prominently featured in the first season of the ABC drama Murder One.

Sandoval has also directed, taking the helm for the third season Medium episode "Whatever Possessed You" which aired in March 2007. He directed one episode in each of seasons four through to seven.

Sandoval co-starred as Judge Hernandez in Bad Judge, an American legal comedy television series co-created by Chad Kultgen and Anne Heche. It premiered on NBC on October 2, 2014. After that, he had roles in Dirk Gently's Holistic Detective Agency, Sharp Objects, and Station 19.

Personal life
Sandoval resides in Los Angeles, California. He and his wife Linda have a daughter, Olivia, an actress who portrayed his character's daughter on Medium.

Filmography

Film performances

Television performances

Video game performances

Web performances

References

External links

Profile of Miguel Sandoval

1951 births
Living people
Male actors from Albuquerque, New Mexico
American male actors of Mexican descent
American male film actors
American male television actors
American male voice actors
Hispanic and Latino American male actors
Male actors from New Mexico
Male actors from Washington, D.C.